The 1998 NASCAR Busch Series began on Saturday, February 14 and ended on Sunday, November 15. Dale Earnhardt Jr. of Dale Earnhardt, Inc. was crowned champion at season's end.

Teams and drivers 
List of full-time teams at the start of 1998.

Races

NAPA Auto Parts 300 

The NAPA Auto Parts 300 was held February 14 at Daytona International Speedway. Mike McLaughlin won the pole. The race was broadcast on CBS

Top ten results

87-Joe Nemechek
4-Jeff Purvis
60-Mark Martin
00-Buckshot Jones
74-Randy LaJoie
17-Matt Kenseth
21-Michael Waltrip
88-Kevin Schwantz
12-Jimmy Spencer
10-Phil Parsons

Failed to qualify: Hank Parker Jr. (#78), Lyndon Amick (#35), Patty Moise (#14), Larry Pearson (#55), Ron Barfield Jr. (#2), Jimmy Foster (#50), Derrike Cope (#92), Blaise Alexander (#20), Doug Reid III (#97), Dale Shaw (#48), Lance Hooper (#23), Chris Diamond (#68), Mark Day (#16)

Dale Earnhardt Jr. had a blowover with Dick Trickle after Trickle turned him.

GM Goodwrench Service Plus 200 

The GM Goodwrench Service Plus 200 was held February 21 at North Carolina Speedway. Tony Stewart won the pole. The race was broadcast on TNN

Top ten results

17-Matt Kenseth
44-Tony Stewart
60-Mark Martin
9-Jeff Burton
34-Mike McLaughlin
66-Elliott Sadler
74-Randy LaJoie
72-Mike Dillon
37-Mark Green
57-Jason Keller

Failed to qualify: Patty Moise (#14), Jimmy Foster (#50), Dale Shaw (#48), Lance Hooper (#23), Ed Berrier (#77), J. D. Gibbs (#42), Kevin Cywinski (#11), Stanton Barrett (#89), Bobby Hillin Jr. (#8), Rick Fuller (#40), Michael Ritch (#58)

This was Kenseth's first career Busch Series victory.

Sam's Town Las Vegas 300 

The Sam's Town Las Vegas 300 was held February 28 at Las Vegas Motor Speedway. Mark Martin won the pole. The race was broadcast on ESPN

Top ten results

12-Jimmy Spencer
3-Dale Earnhardt Jr.
87-Joe Nemechek
9-Jeff Burton
32-Dale Jarrett
60-Mark Martin
72-Mike Dillon
00-Buckshot Jones
29-Hermie Sadler
77-Ed Berrier

Failed to qualify: Hank Parker Jr. (#78), Lyndon Amick (#35), Ron Barfield Jr. (#2), Chris Diamond (#68), Bobby Hillin Jr. (#8), Rick Fuller (#04), Dale Fischlein (#70), Brendan Gaughan (#31)

Randy LaJoie flipped on the final lap of the race.

BellSouth Mobility / Opryland 320 

The BellSouth Mobility / Opryland 320 was held March 15 at Nashville Speedway USA. Casey Atwood won the pole, becoming the youngest pole winner in NASCAR Busch Series history. The race was broadcast on TNN

Top ten results

34-Mike McLaughlin
28-Casey Atwood
3-Dale Earnhardt Jr.
74-Randy LaJoie
57-Jason Keller
87-Joe Nemechek
1-Sterling Marlin
33-Tim Fedewa
64-Dick Trickle
38-Elton Sawyer

Failed to qualify: Hank Parker Jr. (#78), Chris Diamond (#68), Mark Day (#16), Brad Loney (#45), Mike Stefanik (#96), Jeff Krogh (#56), Mark Krogh (#80), Derek Gilcrest (#12)

Diamond Hill Plywood 200 

The Diamond Hill Plywood 200 was held March 21 at Darlington Raceway. Jeff Burton won the pole.

Top ten results

44-Bobby Labonte
9-Jeff Burton
64-Dick Trickle
17-Matt Kenseth
66-Elliott Sadler
72-Mike Dillon
29-Hermie Sadler
34-Mike McLaughlin
59-Robert Pressley
3-Dale Earnhardt Jr.

Failed to qualify: Ron Barfield Jr. (#2), Jeff Fuller (#7), Patty Moise (#14), Jimmy Foster (#50), Dave Blaney (#93), Mike Stefanik (#96)

Moore's Snacks 250 

The Moore's Snacks 250 was held March 28 at Bristol Motor Speedway. Dale Earnhardt Jr. won the pole.

Top ten results

66-Elliott Sadler
3-Dale Earnhardt Jr.
17-Matt Kenseth
38-Elton Sawyer
57-Jason Keller
34-Mike McLaughlin
10-Phil Parsons
89-Stanton Barrett
99-Glenn Allen Jr.
14-Patty Moise

Failed to qualify: Robert Pressley (#59), Hank Parker Jr. (#78), Derrike Cope (#92), Kevin Schwantz (#88), Lyndon Amick (#35)

Coca-Cola 300 

The Coca-Cola 300 was held April 4 at Texas Motor Speedway. Elliott Sadler won the pole.

Top ten results

3-Dale Earnhardt Jr.
66-Elliott Sadler
87-Joe Nemechek
10-Phil Parsons
56-Jeff Krogh
74-Randy LaJoie
37-Mark Green
17-Matt Kenseth
2-Jeff Green
9-Jeff Burton

Failed to qualify: Robert Pressley (#59), Hank Parker Jr. (#78), Dick Trickle (#64), Kevin Schwantz (#88), Mark Day (#16), Bobby Hillin Jr. (#8), Tom Lorenz (#62), Ted Smokstad (#48)

 This was Dale Earnhardt Jr.'s first career Busch Series win.

Galaxy Food Centers 300 

The final Galaxy Food Centers 300 was held April 11 at Hickory Motor Speedway. Robert Pressley won the pole.

Top ten results

77-Ed Berrier
29-Hermie Sadler
33-Tim Fedewa
72-Mike Dillon
17-Matt Kenseth
59-Robert Pressley
30-Mike Cope
3-Dale Earnhardt Jr.
85-Shane Hall
57-Jason Keller

Failed to qualify: Hank Parker Jr. (#78), Kevin Lepage (#40), Blaise Alexander (#20), Patty Moise (#14), Chris Diamond (#68), Johnny Chapman (#21), Johnny Rumley (#96), Shane Jenkins (#49), Randy Porter (#48), Eddie Beahr (#39)

This would be the first and only NASCAR victory of Berrier's career.

Touchstone Energy 300 

The Touchstone Energy 300 was held April 25 at Talladega Superspeedway. Joe Nemechek won the pole. During the race, Dave Blaney
got spun around and flipped onto its side and slammed the wall with his roof.
He walked away.

Top ten results

87-Joe Nemechek
10-Phil Parsons
34-Mike McLaughlin
00-Buckshot Jones
64-Dick Trickle
99-Glenn Allen Jr.
78-Loy Allen Jr.
17-Matt Kenseth
36-Matt Hutter
38-Elton Sawyer

Failed to qualify: Patty Moise (#14), Doug Reid III (#7), Robert Pressley (#59), Mark Day (#16), Rick Wilson (#50)

Gumout Long Life Formula 200 

The Gumout Long Life Formula 200 was held May 9 at New Hampshire International Speedway. Joe Bessey won the pole.

Top ten results

00-Buckshot Jones
44-Tony Stewart
40-Kevin Lepage
4-Jeff Purvis
74-Randy LaJoie
99-Glenn Allen Jr.
34-Mike McLaughlin
52-Kevin Grubb
59-Robert Pressley
3-Dale Earnhardt Jr.

Failed to qualify: Mike Olsen (#61), Joey McCarthy (#41), Tom Bolles (#76), Brian Simo (#03)

First Union 200 

The First Union 200 was held May 17 at Nazareth Speedway. Dale Earnhardt Jr. won the pole.

Top ten results

33-Tim Fedewa
4-Jeff Purvis
34-Mike McLaughlin
17-Matt Kenseth
6-Joe Bessey
77-Ed Berrier
57-Jason Keller
66-Elliott Sadler
99-Glenn Allen Jr.
13-Ted Christopher

Failed to qualify: none

CarQuest Auto Parts 300 

The CarQuest Auto Parts 300 was held May 23 at Lowe's Motor Speedway. Bobby Labonte won the pole.

Top ten results

60-Mark Martin
87-Joe Nemechek
12-Jimmy Spencer
21-Michael Waltrip
17-Matt Kenseth
44-Bobby Labonte
34-Mike McLaughlin
38-Elton Sawyer
8-Bobby Hillin Jr.
29-Hermie Sadler

Failed to qualify: Derrike Cope (#92), Loy Allen Jr. (#78), Lyndon Amick (#35), Matt Hutter (#36), Blaise Alexander (#20), Mike Cope (#30), Kenny Irwin Jr. (#48), Kelly Denton (#75), Mark Krogh (#80), Andy Santerre (#47), Gary Laton (#46)

MBNA Platinum 200 

The MBNA Platinum 200 was held May 30 at Dover International Speedway. Kevin Lepage won the pole.

Top ten results

3-Dale Earnhardt Jr.
8-Bobby Hillin Jr.
44-Tony Stewart
32-Dale Jarrett
34-Mike McLaughlin
59-Robert Pressley
10-Phil Parsons
38-Elton Sawyer
57-Jason Keller
21-Michael Waltrip

Failed to qualify: Bryan Wall (#73), Hal Browning (#46)

Hardee's 250 

The Hardee's 250 was held June 5 at Richmond International Raceway. Wayne Grubb won the pole.

Top ten results

9-Jeff Burton
3-Dale Earnhardt Jr.
17-Matt Kenseth
83-Wayne Grubb
60-Mark Martin
57-Jason Keller
40-Kevin Lepage
64-Dick Trickle
52-Kevin Grubb
59-Robert Pressley

Failed to qualify: Dale Jarrett (#32), Jeff Krogh (#56), J. D. Gibbs (#42), Blaise Alexander (#20), Ted Christopher (#13), Derrike Cope (#92), Patty Moise (#14), Joey McCarthy (#41), Mike Laughlin Jr. (#45), Mike Olsen (#61), Derek Gilcrest (#12)

Lycos.com 250 

The inaugural Lycos.com 250 was held June 14 at Pikes Peak International Raceway. Matt Kenseth won the pole.

Top ten results

17-Matt Kenseth
10-Phil Parsons
74-Randy LaJoie
38-Elton Sawyer
4-Jeff Purvis
63-Curtis Markham
37-Mark Green
59-Ron Hornaday Jr.
30-Mike Cope
3-Dale Earnhardt Jr.

Failed to qualify: none

Lysol 200 

The Lysol 200 was held June 28 at Watkins Glen International. Boris Said won the pole.

Top ten results

87-Ron Fellows
34-Mike McLaughlin
9-Ashton Lewis
36-David Green
72-Mike Dillon
40-Jack Sprague
33-Tim Fedewa
3-Dale Earnhardt Jr.
2-Ricky Craven
57-Jason Keller

Failed to qualify: Mark Krogh (#80), John Preston (#55), Rick Bell (#78), Kat Teasdale (#54), Patty Moise (#14), Dale Quarterley (#32N)

With his victory, Fellows became the first Non-American winner in the NASCAR Busch series.

DieHard 250 

The DieHard 250 was held July 5 at The Milwaukee Mile. Jeff Purvis won the pole.

Top ten results

3-Dale Earnhardt Jr.
38-Elton Sawyer
4-Jeff Purvis
36-David Green
17-Matt Kenseth
34-Mike McLaughlin
00-Buckshot Jones
33-Tim Fedewa
6-Joe Bessey
74-Randy LaJoie

Failed to qualify: none

Myrtle Beach 250 

The Myrtle Beach 250 was held July 11 at Myrtle Beach Speedway. Tim Fedewa won the pole.

Top ten results

74-Randy LaJoie
36-David Green
34-Mike McLaughlin
35-Lyndon Amick
3-Dale Earnhardt Jr.
33-Tim Fedewa
6-Joe Bessey
17-Matt Kenseth
37-Mark Green
66-Elliott Sadler

Failed to qualify: Bobby Hillin Jr. (#8), Kevin Prince (#90), Johnny Chapman (#73), Blaise Alexander (#20), Patty Moise (#14), Jimmy Foster (#50), Mark Krogh (#80), Eddie Beahr (#39)

Kenwood Home & Car Audio 300 

The Kenwood Home & Car Audio 300 was held July 19 at California Speedway. Robert Pressley won the pole.

Top ten results

3-Dale Earnhardt Jr.
40-Kevin Lepage
17-Matt Kenseth
10-Phil Parsons
36-David Green
4-Jeff Purvis
66-Elliott Sadler
56-Mark Krogh
6-Joe Bessey
72-Mike Dillon

Failed to qualify: none

Lycos.com 300 presented by Vallydale Foods 

The Lycos.com 300 presented by Vallydale Foods was held July 25 at South Boston Speedway. Dale Earnhardt Jr. won the pole.

Top ten results

33-Tim Fedewa
74-Randy LaJoie
34-Mike McLaughlin
36-David Green
30-Todd Bodine
63-Curtis Markham
66-Elliott Sadler
85-Shane Hall
35-Lyndon Amick
59-Kevin Lepage

Failed to qualify: Kevin Prince (#90), Ashton Lewis (#89), Mark Krogh (#80), Jeff Krogh (#56), Jim Bown (#78), Toby Robertson (#12), Patty Moise (#14), Kelly Denton (#75), Johnny Chapman (#73), Casey Atwood (#27)

Kroger 200 

The Kroger 200 was held July 31 at Indianapolis Raceway Park. Buckshot Jones won the pole.

Top ten results

3-Dale Earnhardt Jr.
66-Elliott Sadler
00-Buckshot Jones
74-Randy LaJoie
36-David Green
17-Matt Kenseth
21-Mike Bliss
38-Elton Sawyer
15-Mike Wallace
8-Bobby Hillin Jr.

Failed to qualify: Brad Noffsinger (#43), Mark McFarland (#82), Mark Day (#16), Stevie Reeves (#54), Kenneth Nichols (#94)

 This race marked the debut of Jimmie Johnson in NASCAR.

Pepsi 200 presented by Devilbiss 

The Pepsi 200 presented by Devilbiss was held August 15 at Michigan International Speedway. Jeff Burton won the pole. This would be the last time that all drivers were still running at the end of the race until the Sparks 300 at Talladega Superspeedway in 2022.

Top ten results

9-Jeff Burton
44-Bobby Labonte
17-Matt Kenseth
40-Kevin Lepage
3-Dale Earnhardt Jr.
60-Mark Martin
8-Bobby Hillin Jr.
38-Elton Sawyer
21-Michael Waltrip
12-Rick Mast

Failed to qualify: Dave Blaney (#93), Dale Fischlein (#70), J. D. Gibbs (#42), Kevin Schwantz (#88), Lyndon Amick (#35), Gary Laton (#46), Casey Atwood (#27)

Food City 250 

The Food City 250 was held August 21 at Bristol Motor Speedway. Steve Grissom won the pole.

Top ten results

40-Kevin Lepage
10-Phil Parsons
32-Dale Jarrett
30-Todd Bodine
33-Tim Fedewa
15-Ken Schrader
83-Wayne Grubb
00-Buckshot Jones
4-Nathan Buttke
36-David Green

Failed to qualify: Michael Waltrip (#21), Lyndon Amick (#35), Greg Marlowe (#78), Mark Day (#16)

Dura-Lube 200 presented by BI-LO 

The Dura-Lube 200 presented by BI-LO was held September 5 at Darlington Raceway. Mike McLaughlin won the pole.

Top ten results

64-Dick Trickle
3-Dale Earnhardt Jr.
34-Mike McLaughlin
40-Kevin Lepage
30-Todd Bodine
17-Matt Kenseth
32-Dale Jarrett
60-Mark Martin
59-Robert Pressley
15-Ken Schrader

Failed to qualify: Jeff Green (#92), Kelly Denton (#75), Ron Barfield Jr. (#2)

With his victory, Trickle became the oldest winner in Busch Series history, at the age of 56 years, 1 month, and 32 days.

Autolite Platinum 250 

The Autolite Platinum 250 was held September 11 at Richmond International Raceway. Andy Santerre won the pole.

Top ten results

3-Dale Earnhardt Jr.
9-Jeff Burton
12-Jimmy Spencer
17-Matt Kenseth
30-Todd Bodine
4-Jeff Purvis
40-Kevin Lepage
64-Dick Trickle
99-Glenn Allen Jr.
47-Andy Santerre

Failed to qualify: Bobby Hamilton Jr. (#95), Dave Rezendes (#78), Casey Atwood (#50), Kevin Schwantz (#88), Ward Burton (#14), Mark Krogh (#80), Mario Gosselin (#71), Ted Christopher (#13), Mark McFarland (#82), J. D. Gibbs (#42)

Steve Grissom qualified for Jimmy Spencer.

MBNA Gold 200 

The MBNA Gold 200 was held September 19 at Dover International Speedway. Kevin Grubb won the pole.

Top ten results

17-Matt Kenseth
52-Kevin Grubb
38-Elton Sawyer
34-Mike McLaughlin
30-Todd Bodine
93-Dave Blaney
4-Jeff Purvis
3-Dale Earnhardt Jr.
2-Ricky Craven
21-Michael Waltrip

Failed to qualify: none

Tracy Leslie replaced Hal Browning in the #46 in the race.

All Pro Bumper to Bumper 300 

The All Pro Bumper to Bumper 300 was held October 3 at Charlotte Motor Speedway. Dave Blaney won the pole.

Top ten results

34-Mike McLaughlin
17-Matt Kenseth
3-Dale Earnhardt Jr.
12-Jimmy Spencer
00-Buckshot Jones
9-Jeff Burton
40-Kevin Lepage
92-Todd Bodine
4-Jeff Purvis
1-Sterling Marlin

Failed to qualify: Bobby Hillin Jr. (#8), Patty Moise (#14), Toby Porter (#91), Ashton Lewis (#89), Kelly Denton (#75), Jeff Green (#92), Lance Hooper (#23), Jim Bown (#51), Jason Jarrett (#11), Lyndon Amick (#35), Kevin Grubb (#43), Kerry Earnhardt (#04), Matt Hutter (#24), Wayne Grubb (#83), Andy Santerre (#47), Hank Parker Jr. (#53)

Carquest Auto Parts 250 

The Carquest Auto Parts 250 was held October 17 at Gateway International Raceway. Shane Hall won the pole.

Top ten results

3-Dale Earnhardt Jr.
17-Matt Kenseth
4-Jeff Purvis
47-Andy Santerre
44-Tony Stewart
93-Dave Blaney
74-Randy LaJoie
85-Shane Hall
30-Todd Bodine
40-Kevin Lepage

Failed to qualify: Tracy Leslie (#2), Joey McCarthy (#41), Eric Bodine (#1), Melvin Walen (#58), J. D. Gibbs (#42)

AC Delco 200 

The AC Delco 200 was held October 31 at North Carolina Speedway. Tony Stewart won the pole.

Top ten results

66-Elliott Sadler
40-Kevin Lepage
29-Hermie Sadler
52-Kevin Grubb
84-Philip Morris
53-Hank Parker Jr.
72-Mike Dillon
8-Bobby Hillin Jr.
33-Tim Fedewa
63-Curtis Markham

Failed to qualify: Tracy Leslie (#97), J. D. Gibbs (#42), Jeff Green (#92), Mike Wallace (#50), Bryan Wall (#73), Scott Hansen (#09), Lyndon Amick (#35), Matt Hutter (#55), Ted Christopher (#13), Chuck Bown (#51), Jeff Finley (#79), Mark Day (#16)

Stihl 300 

The Stihl 300 was originally scheduled for March 1998 but was held November 7 at Atlanta Motor Speedway after it and the Winston Cup Series Primestar 500 were both rained out. Dick Trickle won the pole.

Top ten results

60-Mark Martin
3-Dale Earnhardt Jr.
44-Tony Stewart
17-Matt Kenseth
00-Buckshot Jones
52-Kevin Grubb
87-Joe Nemechek
10-Phil Parsons
21-Michael Waltrip
15-Ken Schrader

Failed to qualify: Tracy Leslie (#97), Lyndon Amick (#35), Hut Stricklin (#92), Gary Bradberry (#86), Curtis Markham (#89), Randy MacDonald (#7), Nathan Buttke (#78), Ken Bouchard (#50), Jeff Finley (#79), Morgan Shepherd (#07)

Jiffy Lube Miami 300 

The Jiffy Lube Miami 300 was held November 15 at Homestead-Miami Speedway. Casey Atwood won the pole.

Top ten results

9-Jeff Burton
12-Jimmy Spencer
60-Mark Martin
17-Matt Kenseth
36-David Green
93-Dave Blaney
26-Johnny Benson
99-Glenn Allen Jr.
74-Randy LaJoie
33-Tim Fedewa

Failed to qualify: Chuck Bown (#92), Ted Christopher (#13), Jeff Krogh (#56), Patty Moise (#14), John Preston (#89), Nathan Buttke (#78), Kevin Schwantz (#88), Morgan Shepherd (#07), Philip Morris (#84), Hank Parker Jr. (#53), Lyndon Amick (#35), Freddie Query (#7), Gus Wasson (#49), Mark Krogh (#80)

Final points standings 

Dale Earnhardt Jr. - 4469
Matt Kenseth - 4421
Mike McLaughlin - 4045
Randy LaJoie - 3543
Elton Sawyer - 3533
Phil Parsons - 3525
Tim Fedewa - 3515
Elliott Sadler - 3470
Buckshot Jones - 3453
Hermie Sadler - 3340
Glenn Allen Jr. - 3270
Mike Dillon - 3250
Mark Green - 3075
Kevin Lepage - 3052
Jeff Purvis - 3019
Jason Keller - 2971
Ed Berrier - 2772
Joe Bessey - 2763
Shane Hall - 2763
Andy Santerre - 2598
Tony Stewart - 2455
Dick Trickle - 2441
Tracy Leslie - 2338
Bobby Hillin Jr. - 2304
Jeff Krogh - 2225
David Green - 2180
Mark Martin - 1976
Mark Krogh - 1917
Dave Blaney - 1915
Jeff Burton - 1883
Robert Pressley - 1870
Blaise Alexander - 1730
Todd Bodine - 1668
Michael Waltrip - 1667
Kevin Grubb - 1660
Wayne Grubb - 1546
Patty Moise - 1421
Casey Atwood - 1359
Joe Nemechek - 1315
Mike Cope - 1293
Dale Jarrett - 1284
Matt Hutter - 1169
Jimmy Spencer - 1164
Lance Hooper - 1059
Lyndon Amick - 1045
Ken Schrader - 977
Jason Jarrett - 935
Jeff Fuller - 899
Stanton Barrett - 865
Kevin Schwantz - 801

Full Drivers' Championship

(key) Bold – Pole position awarded by time. Italics – Pole position set by owner's points. * – Most laps led.

Rookie of the Year 

Andy Santerre, being the only full-time candidate for Rookie of the Year, walked away with the title after finishing 20th in points. 2nd-place-finisher Dave Blaney made his Busch Series debut in 1998, posting three sixth-place finishes over a 20-race stretch. He would be followed by Blaise Alexander, then Wayne and Kevin Grubb, both of whom grabbed their first career pole positions during the season. 18-year-old Casey Atwood ran a part-time schedule in an undeclared season but finished 38th in points. The next two competitors were Mike Cope and Matt Hutter, teammates at Cicci-Welliver Racing but released after a lack of performance. Part-time drivers Lance Hooper, Jason Jarrett, and MotoGP legend Kevin Schwantz rounded out the rookie class of 1998.

See also 
 1998 NASCAR Winston Cup Series
 1998 NASCAR Craftsman Truck Series

External links 
Busch Series standings and statistics for 1998

NASCAR Xfinity Series seasons